Celebridade is a Brazilian telenovela that was produced and aired by TV Globo from October 13, 2003 to June 25, 2004, totaling 221 episodes.

Featured Malu Mader, Marcos Palmeira, Cláudia Abreu, Fábio Assunção, Marcio Garcia, Deborah Secco, Juliana Paes, Marcelo Faria, Alexandre Borges, Júlia Lemmertz, Nathalia Timberg, Bruno Gagliasso, Hugo Carvana, Nívea Maria, Juliana Knust and Deborah Evelyn in leading roles.

Plot 
The plot revolves around the rivalry between two women: successful businesswoman and former model Maria Clara Diniz, owner of Mello Diniz event producing company, and the envious Laura Prudente da Costa, which gets close to Maria Clara claiming to be her greatest fan and gets a job in her company.

In fact, Laura is an imposter who wants not only to take everything from the other woman, but become a new Maria Clara. In the plot, the reason for Laura's hatred of Maria Clara is that she (Laura) is the daughter of the true muse who inspired the song that made Maria Clara a rich and famous woman, while she and her mother suffered a miserable life. Maria Clara, however, always believed that the song had been composed by her ex-boyfriend Wagner in her honor. To carry out the plan to destroy her rival, Laura enlists the help of Marcos, her lover and accomplice. They begin to work for Maria Clara respectively as an assistant and a driver, and slowly infiltrate themselves into her life.

Cast

Awards and nominations

References

External links
 

2003 Brazilian television series debuts
2004 Brazilian television series endings
2003 telenovelas
TV Globo telenovelas
Telenovelas by Gilberto Braga
Brazilian telenovelas
Brazilian LGBT-related television shows
Portuguese-language telenovelas
Television shows set in Rio de Janeiro (city)
Television series about show business